Seisholtzville is a village located mainly in Hereford Township, Berks County, Pennsylvania, United States, but also in Longswamp Township. It is located on the crest of South Mountain and the Perkiomen Creek begins here. It uses the Macungie zip code of 18062. The area code is 610 and it is served by the Bally telephone exchange.

Siesholtzville is named after a former hotel keeper at this place. The first public place was opened circa 1800; a post office was established in 1849.

The correct pronunciation is "SEE-sholtz-vil," although the pronunciation of "SEE-sawz-vil" is also heard. The German word for liquorice is "Süßholz" which becomes "sees-holtz" in Pennsylvania German with the meaning "sweet"-"wood". "Süßholtz" also "Süssholtz", "Süßholz" and "Süssholz" is a German family name. In English spelling it becomes "Seesholtz", "Seasholtz" or "Seisholtz" and even "Seasholes". All this indicates "Seece-holts-vil" as the original pronunciation of the village.

Unincorporated communities in Berks County, Pennsylvania
Unincorporated communities in Pennsylvania